Shmelyovo is a rural locality (a village) in Malyginskoye Rural Settlement, Kovrovsky District, Vladimir Oblast, Russia. The population was 34 as of 2010.

Geography 
Shmelyovo is located 19 km north of Kovrov (the district's administrative centre) by road. Rogozinikha is the nearest rural locality.

References 

Rural localities in Kovrovsky District